Mireille Perrey (1904–1991) was a French stage and film actress. Perrey played some leading roles in the 1930s but gradually developed into a character actor, appearing in films such as the British comedy Hotel Sahara (1951). In 1964 she was featured in The Umbrellas of Cherbourg.

Between 1942 and 1947 she was a member of the Comédie-Française.

Filmography

References

Bibliography
 Goble, Alan. The Complete Index to Literary Sources in Film. Walter de Gruyter, 1999.

External links

1904 births
1991 deaths
20th-century French actresses
French stage actresses
French film actresses
Actresses from Bordeaux